Cairo is an unincorporated community in Coal County, Oklahoma, United States. It is located seven miles northeast of Coalgate. The community was named after the town of Cairo, Illinois. A post office operated in Cairo from March 28, 1902 to July 15, 1939.

References

Unincorporated communities in Coal County, Oklahoma
Unincorporated communities in Oklahoma